Sjuan (formerly TV4 Plus) is a sister channel of Swedish TV4, owned by TV4 AB. The main focus of the channel is on entertainment, sports and lifestyle programmes. The channel started as TV4 Plus in 2003 but changed name to Sjuan in September 2011.

The channel was launched in 2003 on digital terrestrial, digital satellite and cable networks. The channel could be received by many households from its launch and became the seventh most watched television channel in 2005.

Sjuan has been showing Late Night with Conan O'Brien since its launch. In 2004, Sjuan took over Dr. Phil from its parent channel. In 2005, they also took over The Bold and the Beautiful from its parent channel.

Sjuan also broadcasts much sports, including La Liga and Serie A matches every weekend.

Other channels from TV4 AB include TV12 (youth and entertainment), TV4 Film (movies), TV4 Komedi (sitcoms), TV4 Guld (old classic series) and TV4 Fakta (documentaries).

In April 2011, TV4 announced that TV4 Plus would change its name to Sjuan, with the complete change to happen on 12 September 2011.

From September 1, 2020 the TV4 Group channels, including Sjuan, became available on the Dplay - Discovery SVOD service (later renamed to Discovery+).

Identity

At first, the channel was intended to be a sports channel but the profile was widened before launch to also include lifestyle programming and entertainment. The initial name "TV4 Plus" was decided upon during the autumn of 2002.

The first logotype and idents were designed in cooperation with the British design agency Kemistry. The logo consisted of a cube, a die with '4' and '+' symbols on the sides. The dice was chosen as the channel originally included much sports and betting programming. The idents were replaced a few years later.

On 5 February 2007 Sjuan overhauled its on-air look, dropping the cube logo and replacing it with a blue version of TV4's Circle 4 logo (with a plus sign attached to it), and new idents featuring people engaged in different hobbies.

Logos

References

External links
  

Television channels in Sweden
TV4 AB
Television channels and stations established in 2003
2003 establishments in Sweden